Sad Sack could refer to: 

Sad Sack, an American comic strip and comic book character created by Sgt. George Baker
The Sad Sack, a 1957 American film based on the George Baker characters
Sad Sack Laugh Special, a 1958-1977 American comic book series featuring Sad Sack characters
Sad Sad Sack World, a 1964-1973 American comic book series featuring Sad Sack characters
"Sad Sack", a 2004 season 2 episode of Arrested Development
"Sad Sack Wasp Trap", a 2018 season 1 episode of Succession

See also
Half-Sack Epps, a SAMCRO member on Sons of Anarchy